A reef is a ridge or shoal of rock, coral or similar relatively stable material, lying beneath the surface of a natural body of water. Many reefs result from natural, abiotic (non-living) processes such as deposition of sand or wave erosion planing down rock outcrops. However, reefs such as the coral reefs of tropical waters are formed by biotic (living) processes, dominated by corals and coralline algae. Artificial reefs such as shipwrecks and other man-made underwater structures may occur intentionally or as the result of an accident, and are sometimes designed to increase the physical complexity of featureless sand bottoms to attract a more diverse range of organisms. Reefs are often quite near to the surface, but not all definitions require this.

Biotic 

There is a variety of biotic reef types, including oyster reefs and sponge reefs, but the most massive and widely distributed are tropical coral reefs. Although corals are major contributors to the framework and bulk material comprising a coral reef; the organisms most responsible for reef growth against the constant assault from ocean waves are calcareous algae, especially, although not entirely, coralline algae.

The preferred substrate for oyster larvae is the shells of oysters so they tend to settle on adult oysters and thereby develop layers building upwards, eventually forming a fairly massive hard stony calcium carbonate structure on which other reef organisms like sponges and seaweeds can grow, and provide a habitat for mobile benthic organisms.

These biotic reef types take on additional names depending upon how the reef lies in relation to the land, if any. Reef types include fringing reefs, barrier reefs, and atolls. A fringing reef is a reef that is attached to an island. A barrier reef forms a calcareous barrier around an island, resulting in a lagoon between the shore and the reef. An atoll is a ring reef with no land present. The reef front (ocean side) is a high energy locale, whereas the internal lagoon will be at a lower energy with fine grained sediments.

Mounds 
One definition distinguishes reefs from mounds as follows: both are considered to be varieties of organosedimentary buildups – sedimentary features, built by the interaction of organisms and their environment, that have synoptic relief and whose biotic composition differs from that found on and beneath the surrounding sea floor. Reefs are held up by a macroscopic skeletal framework. Coral reefs are an example of this kind. Corals and calcareous algae grow on top of one another and form a three-dimensional framework that is modified in various ways by other organisms and inorganic processes. By contrast, mounds lack a macroscopic skeletal framework. Mounds are built by microorganisms or by organisms that don't grow a skeletal framework. A microbial mound might be built exclusively or primarily by cyanobacteria. Examples of biostromes formed by cyanobacteria occur in the Great Salt Lake in Utah, United States, and in Shark Bay on the coast of Western Australia.

Cyanobacteria do not have skeletons, and individuals are microscopic. Cyanobacteria can encourage the precipitation or accumulation of calcium carbonate to produce distinct sediment bodies in composition that have relief on the seafloor.  Cyanobacterial mounds were most abundant before the evolution of shelly macroscopic organisms, but they still exist today; stromatolites are microbial mounds with a laminated internal structure. Bryozoans and crinoids, common contributors to marine sediments during the Mississippian, for instance, produced a very different kind of mound. Bryozoans are small and the skeletons of crinoids disintegrate. However, bryozoan and crinoid meadows can persist over time and produce compositionally distinct bodies of sediment with depositional relief.

The Proterozoic Belt Supergroup contains evidence of possible microbial mat and dome structures similar to stromatolite and chicken reef complexes.

Geologic 
Rocky reefs are underwater outcrops of rock projecting above the adjacent unconsolidated surface with varying relief. They can be found in depth ranges from intertidal to deep water, and provide a substrate for a large range of sessile benthic organisms, and shelter for a large range of mobile organisms.

Structures 

Ancient reefs buried within stratigraphic sections are of considerable interest to geologists because they provide paleo-environmental information about the location in Earth's history. In addition, reef structures within a sequence of sedimentary rocks provide a discontinuity which may serve as a trap or conduit for fossil fuels or mineralizing fluids to form petroleum or ore deposits.

Corals, including some major extinct groups Rugosa and Tabulata, have been important reef builders through much of the Phanerozoic since the Ordovician Period. However, other organism groups, such as calcifying algae, especially members of the red algae (Rhodophyta), and molluscs (especially the rudist bivalves during the Cretaceous Period) have created massive structures at various times. During the Cambrian Period, the conical or tubular skeletons of Archaeocyatha, an extinct group of uncertain affinities (possibly sponges), built reefs. Other groups, such as the Bryozoa, have been important interstitial organisms, living between the framework builders. The corals which build reefs today, the Scleractinia, arose after the Permian–Triassic extinction event that wiped out the earlier rugose corals (as well as many other groups), and became increasingly important reef builders throughout the Mesozoic Era. They may have arisen from a rugose coral ancestor. Rugose corals built their skeletons of calcite and have a different symmetry from that of the scleractinian corals, whose skeletons are aragonite. However, there are some unusual examples of well-preserved aragonitic rugose corals in the Late Permian. In addition, calcite has been reported in the initial post-larval calcification in a few scleractinian corals. Nevertheless, scleractinian corals (which arose in the middle Triassic) may have arisen from a non-calcifying ancestor independent of the rugosan corals (which disappeared in the late Permian).

Artificial 

An artificial reef is a human-created underwater structure, typically built to promote marine life in areas with a generally featureless bottom, to control erosion, block ship passage, block the use of trawling nets, or improve surfing.

Many reefs are built using objects that were built for other purposes, for example by sinking oil rigs (through the Rigs-to-Reefs program), scuttling ships, or by deploying rubble or construction debris. Other artificial reefs are purpose built (e.g. the reef balls) from PVC or concrete. Shipwrecks become artificial reefs on the seafloor. Regardless of construction method, artificial reefs generally provide stable hard surfaces where algae and invertebrates such as barnacles, corals, and oysters attach; the accumulation of attached marine life in turn provides intricate structure and food for assemblages of fish.

See also

References

Sources 
 Shears N.T. (2007) Biogeography, community structure and biological habitat types of subtidal reefs on the South Island West Coast, New Zealand. Science for Conservation 281.  p 53. Department of Conservation, New Zealand.

External links 

 Reef Rescue - Smithsonian Ocean Portal
 Coral Reefs of the Tropics : facts, photos and movies from The Nature Conservancy
 NOAA Photo Library
 Reef Environmental Education Foundation
  NOS Data Explorer - A portal to obtain NOAA National Ocean Service data
 Reef formation
 Atolls – Distribution, Development and Architecture

Stratigraphy
Coastal geography
Coastal and oceanic landforms